Vila Nova is a civil parish in the municipality of Praia da Vitória on the island of Terceira in the Portuguese Azores. The population in 2011 was 1,678, in an area of 8.14 km². It contains the localities Alminhas, Canada da Bezerra, Canada da Estaca, Canada do Boqueiro, Faias, Nossa Senhora da Ajuda, Ribeira de Agualva and Vila Nova.

History

In its early settlement, the area of Vila Nova was known for its abundance of water; in 1891 there were 14 water fountains supplying potable water to the community. Although primarily a subsistence agriculture community, dominated by the harvesting of cereal crops, the area was also a refuge and settlement for many noble families.

Geography
The area is characterized by rocky coastal zone, that includes the bay and beach of Praia das Escaleiras, and a more elevated area that includes prime agricultural lands in Alminhas, Canada do Boqueiro and Canada da Bezerra.

Ecoregions/Protected areas
 Praia das Escaleiras
 Calvário

Architecture

Civic
 Chafariz da Canada da Bezerra
 Chafariz do Pico da Rocha
 Watermill of Agualva

Religious
 Igreja Paroquial do Divino Espírito Santo
 Império do Divino Espírito Santo
 Ermida de Nossa Senhora da Ajuda

References

Freguesias of Praia da Vitória